The 2009 FIA WTCC Race of Italy (formally the 2009 FIA WTCC Stihl Race of Italy) was the tenth round of the 2009 World Touring Car Championship season, and the fifth running of the FIA WTCC Race of Italy. It was held on 20 September 2009 at the Autodromo Enzo e Dino Ferrari near Imola, in Italy. It was the first time the Race of Italy was held at the circuit, although it had previously held races in 2005 and 2008, under the Race of San Marino and Race of Europe titles respectively. The races were won by SEAT Sport drivers Gabriele Tarquini and Yvan Muller who both finished second to their teammate in the other races.

Background
Gabriele Tarquini arrived at his home race in Italy as the new championship leader, with a one-point lead over BMW Team Germany's Augusto Farfus. Previous series leader Yvan Muller was a further six points behind for SEAT.

There were 25 cars taking part at the event. Making his World Championship debut for Proteam was Fabio Fabiani, the reigning European Touring Car Cup champion in the Super Production class. Returning to the series after limited races in 2005 was Andrea Larini, younger brother of Chevrolet driver Nicola, in the SUNRED-run SEAT León Eurocup prize car.

James Thompson returned to the Lada Sport team, taking his Priora back off team principal Viktor Shapovalov, who stood in for Thompson in Germany due to commitments in V8 Supercar. Also returning was Mehdi Bennani and the Exagon Engineering team after missing the previous two rounds.

Report

Free Practice
Championship leader Tarquini was fastest in the first practice session, ahead of BMW Team Italy-Spain's Alessandro Zanardi and Yvan Muller. Independent's Trophy leader Tom Coronel was fourth fastest ahead of Farfus and Sergio Hernández.

Jordi Gené was fastest in the second session for SEAT, ahead of teammate Rickard Rydell and BMW Team UK's Andy Priaulx. The session ended a couple of minutes early as the red flag was brought out after a collision between independent BMW drivers Stefano D'Aste and Fabio Fabiani, which left Fabiani stranded in the gravel.

Qualifying
The first session decided which ten drivers would make it through to the second session. Tarquini was fastest as all five SEAT drivers made it through to Q2. Only two BMW's made it through, with Farfus and Priaulx joined by all three Chevrolet drivers. D'Aste was the fastest independent in 14th, one place ahead of Thompson's Lada.

The second session determined the starting positions of the top ten. The five SEATs followed each other round to gain a slipstreaming benefit. Tarquini was the fastest of the train, ahead of Yvan Muller and Rydell. Rob Huff was fourth fastest for Chevrolet, ahead of SEAT driver Tiago Monteiro and Farfus. Priaulx, Gené and Chevrolet's Nicola Larini were seventh, eighth and ninth. The third Chevrolet driver Alain Menu did not take part in Q2 after his car returned to the pits at the end of Q1 spewing out oil. He was later given a ten-place grid penalty for an engine change.

Race One
Tarquini led from the start of the race until the finish, although it was a busy race for those behind him. Several front-runners were taken out of contention on the opening lap at the first Tamburello chicane. Jordi Gené triggered the accident when he hit Rob Huff's Chevrolet under breaking. Huff lost control and made contact with Rickard Rydell, who then hit his SEAT teammate Gené and then Augusto Farfus. Jörg Müller and Tiago Monteiro also suffered damage in the incident. All except Monteiro were able to make it to the pits and return to the action later in the race. Tarquini led from Yvan Muller, Huff, and Alex Zanardi. Tom Coronel and James Thompson were able to make up a host of places after avoiding the carnage by running through the gravel at the chicane, and finished in fifth and sixth. A train formed behind Thompson's Lada, and Stefano D'Aste ran off the track after out-breaking himself trying to pass Thompson. He made contact with Alain Menu's Chevrolet on rejoining the circuit, tipping D'Aste into a spin. Elsewhere, Kristian Poulsen tapped Jaap van Lagen into a spin, which resulted in van Lagen's Lada hitting a tyre wall and then flipping through the gravel trap, which brought out the safety car. Poulsen was then hit by teammate and team owner Franz Engstler. Andy Priaulx lost out in the fight for the eighth place, going off the circuit twice before eventually finishing fifteenth. Guest driver Andrea Larini was black-flagged for not wearing fire-proof underwear.

Race Two
Yvan Muller ended a run of poor results in race two by winning ahead of SEAT Sport teammate Tarquini. Muller had started seventh but he was able to pass race leader Menu on the third lap and led the rest of the way. Tarquini made contact with the Chevrolet car of Huff but remained on the tail of Muller. Tarquini fought for the lead but bumped into the back of Muller in trying to do so. Down the field, SEAT driver Gené attempted a pass on Hernández but misjudged it and spun the BMW. Fellow SEAT driver Monteiro also clipped another car, this time the SUNRED Engineering car of Tom Boardman. Monteiro went off the track as a consequence, cutting the corner at Rivazza and almost hitting Boardman as he rejoined the track. At the end Yvan Muller was first ahead of Tarquini and Menu while Thompson finished sixth in the Lada. Farfus was the final points scorer while D'Aste was the independents' trophy winner.

Results

Qualifying

Race 1

Bold denotes Fastest lap.

Race 2

Bold denotes Fastest lap.

Standings after the race

Drivers' Championship standings

Yokohama Independents' Trophy standings

Manufacturers' Championship standings

 Note: Only the top five positions are included for both sets of drivers' standings.

References

External links
Results Booklet PDF at MST Systems

Race of Italy
Italy